Etta Neumann was a female Austrian international table tennis player.

Table tennis career
She won a bronze medal at the 1930 World Table Tennis Championships in the doubles with Josefine Kolbe.

See also
 List of table tennis players
 List of World Table Tennis Championships medalists

References

Austrian female table tennis players
World Table Tennis Championships medalists